Peter Aldrich Homestead is a historic home located at Gardiner in Ulster County, New York.  It is a -story frame dwelling built in stages, with the oldest section dating to about 1750.  The interior features notable Federal period decorative woodwork.

It was listed on the National Register of Historic Places in 1983.

References

Houses on the National Register of Historic Places in New York (state)
Houses completed in 1750
Houses in Ulster County, New York
National Register of Historic Places in Ulster County, New York